Thane is one of the 36 districts in the Maharashtra state of India. The district is on the western coast and falls under the Konkan division of the state.

Until 1 August 2014 the district was divided into 15 talukas, viz. Thane, Kalyan, Murbad, Bhiwandi, Shahapur, Vasai, Ulhasnagar, Ambarnath, Dahanu, Palghar, Talasari, Jawhar, Mokhada, Vada , Boisar and Vikramgad. However, on that date the district was split in two with the creation of a new Palghar district, which took 8 of these talukas, leaving the reduced Thane district comprising Thane, Kalyan, Murbad, Bhiwandi, Shahapur, Ulhasnagar and Ambarnath talukas.

The following are separate lists of towns/villages in the reduced Thane district and the new Palghar district. The population data is per Census 2011.

Thane district

Ambarnath

Bhiwandi

Kalyan

Murbad

Shahapur

Thane

Ulhasnagar

Palghar District

Dahanu

Jawhar

Mokhada

Palghar

Talasari

Vada

Vasai

Vikramgad

See also

References 

Villages in Thane district
Thane